"Starstruck" is a song by British musician Olly Alexander, released under his solo project Years & Years. It was released for digital download and streaming on 8 April 2021. The song was written by Clarence Coffee Jr., Mark Ralph, Nathaniel Ledwidge and Olly Alexander, and marks the first release of Years & Years as Alexander's solo project following the departure of Mikey Goldsworthy and Emre Türkmen. A remix featuring Australian singer Kylie Minogue was released on 21 May 2021. On 15 February 2022, a remix featuring Japanese singer SIRUP was released.

Background
On 29 March 2021, Olly Alexander uploaded a preview of the single on his TikTok account, and shared the news on his other social media accounts. He also introduced a 'Starstruck Challenge', explaining it as "all about showing your finest post-lockdown glow up that is leaving everyone star-struck because you look so fine".

In a statement, Alexander explained that the track "came together one night at a studio in the countryside outside of London" and that he has been "putting all" his "pent up energy" into music because of the COVID-19 lockdowns. He further elaborated that "'Starstruck' is about the rush you get when you're with somebody you're really into, it's about holding onto a good feeling and not letting it go. Like most of us I've spent the past year at home, and I wanted to create something super positive and fun for people (and myself) to bop along to."

On 18 May 2021, Years & Years confirmed a remix of "Starstruck" featuring Kylie Minogue. On 21 May 2021, the remix was released and featured new vocals by Minogue. A CD single including Kylie Minogue remix and original version was released on 4 June 2021.

The remix with Minogue was picked by Billboard as one of the 25 Best Pride Songs of 2021, stating the singers "trade lines on the bubbly verses and come together to belt the luminous, oh-so-catchy chorus for the burst of serotonin we’ve all been desperately seeking over the past year."

Music video
A music video to accompany the release of "Starstruck" was first released on YouTube on 12 April 2021. The video was directed by Fred Rowson. It features Alexander being romantically pursued around a large house by a clone of himself. Near the end of the video, it is revealed that the incident was Alexander's imagination and he was really admiring his reflection before performing a series of dance moves in a large room.

Live performances
On 16 April 2021, Alexander performed the song live on The Graham Norton Show and The One Show. On 25 April, he performed again on Sunday Brunch and at The Late Late Show with James Corden on 28 April. It was performed as the opening to the 2021 British Academy Television Awards. It was included as part of the setlist of Alexander's 2022 Night Call Tour as the final song before the encore.

Personnel
Credits adapted from Tidal.
 DetoNate – producer, co-producer
 Mark Ralph – producer, composer, lyricist, associated performer, bass, co-producer, executive producer, guitar, music production, percussion, programming, synthesizer
 Clarence Coffee Jr. – composer, lyricist, associated performer, music production
 Nathaniel Ledwidge – composer, lyricist
 Olly Alexander – composer, lyricist, associated performer, vocals
 Dan Grech-Marguerat – associated performer, mixer, programming, studio personnel
 Charles Haydon Hicks – assistant recording engineer, studio personnel
 Luke Burgoyne – assistant recording engineer, studio personnel
 Gemma Chester – engineer, studio personnel
 Josh Green – engineer, studio personnel
 John Davis – mastering engineer, studio personnel

Charts and certifications

Certifications

Release history

References

 

2021 songs
2021 singles
Years & Years songs
Song recordings produced by Mark Ralph (record producer)
Songs written by Clarence Coffee Jr.
Songs written by Mark Ralph (record producer)
Songs written by Olly Alexander
Kylie Minogue songs